The 2017–18 season will be Raith Rovers' first season in the third tier of Scottish football since being relegated from the Scottish Championship via the play-offs at the end of the 2016–17 season. Raith Rovers will also compete in the Challenge Cup, League Cup and the Scottish Cup.

Summary

Management

Raith will be led by manager Barry Smith for the 2017–18 season for his 1st season at the club.

Results and fixtures

Pre-season

Scottish League One

Scottish Championship play-offs

Scottish Challenge Cup

Scottish League Cup

Table

Matches

Scottish Cup

Player statistics

Squad 
Last updated 5 May 2018

|}

Squad numbers are not compulsory in Scottish League One.

Disciplinary record
Includes all competitive matches.

Last updated May 2018

Team statistics

League table

Division summary

Management statistics
Last updated on 5 May 2018

Notes

References

Raith Rovers F.C. seasons
Raith Rovers